Hard Times is the third and final studio album by the American band Laughing Hyenas, released on January 23, 1995 by Touch and Go Records.

Reception

AllMusic critic Mark Deming noted the Rolling Stones influence and praised the album for "starting at the dark, scary heart of Exile on Main Street and moving on into places where few bands would dare to go". Entertainment Weekly gave it an A−, saying the album "has the malaise-fueled, foot-to-the-pedal pull of the Stooges or the Stones".

Track listing

Personnel
Adapted from the Hard Times liner notes.

Laughing Hyenas
John Brannon – vocals
Ron Sakowski – bass guitar, acoustic guitar (6)
Larissa Strickland – electric guitar, acoustic guitar
Todd Swalla – drums, percussion

Additional musicians and production
Doug Easley – production, engineering, steel pedal guitar (6)
Laughing Hyenas – production
Davis McCain – production, engineering

Release history

References

External links 
 

1995 albums
Touch and Go Records albums
Laughing Hyenas albums